Kirstin Taylor Maldonado (born May 16, 1992) is an American singer, songwriter and actress. She is best known as the mezzo-soprano of the a cappella group Pentatonix. With the group, she has released seven studio albums, won three Grammy Awards, and sold over six million albums.

Maldonado released her debut solo single "Break a Little" on May 19, 2017, under the name Kirstin™ (stylized as kırstın™;™ stands for "Taylor Maldonado"). Her first extended play Love (stylized as L O V E) was released on July 14. Maldonado made her Broadway debut in 2018 as Lauren in the musical Kinky Boots.

Early life and education 
Kirstin Taylor Maldonado was born in Fort Worth, Texas, on May 16, 1992. Her mother, Angelica Maldonado, is of Spanish and Italian descent, while her father, Michael Cisneros, is of Mexican descent. She was raised by her mother in Arlington, Texas. She was only five years old when she first expressed her wish to become a singer. At eight years old, she sang at her mother's wedding reception, ultimately convincing her mother to enroll her in voice lessons. She also got into theater and starred in several local productions. It was through the local theater community that Maldonado met Mitch Grassi, a future fellow Pentatonix member.

Maldonado attended Holy Rosary Catholic School, and later Martin High School. At Martin High School, she met Scott Hoying with whom she and Grassi would later form Pentatonix. The three friends created an a cappella trio and started getting attention around their school for their covers of popular songs. She graduated from Martin High School in 2010 and attended the University of Oklahoma, where she studied musical theatre on a full-ride scholarship as a National Hispanic Scholar. During her time in college, she joined Kappa Kappa Gamma. She left before completing her degree to form Pentatonix.

Career

Pentatonix 

In 2011, Maldonado was contacted by her high school friend Scott Hoying who wanted to put together a group for NBC's a cappella competition The Sing-Off.  Maldonado agreed to join the group, which also included Mitch Grassi, another of her high school friends. Together they formed the a cappella group Pentatonix along with Avi Kaplan and Kevin Olusola. The group entered and eventually won the third season of The Sing-Off. Since then, they have released several albums and EPs, reached 13 million YouTube subscribers and over 2 billion YouTube views, and toured the world. On February 8, 2015, Pentatonix won their first Grammy for Best Arrangement, Instrumental or A Cappella for their Daft Punk medley. On February 15, 2016, Pentatonix won their second Grammy in the same category for their rendition of "Dance of the Sugar Plum Fairy" which was featured on their holiday album, That's Christmas to Me. On February 12, 2017, Pentatonix won their third Grammy for Best Country Duo/Group Performance for their cover of "Jolene" which featured Dolly Parton.

Solo projects and appearances 
In January 2016, Maldonado performed the song "Somewhere Over the Rainbow" at the World Dog Awards in honor of the dogs who have played the role of Toto from the iconic story about The Wizard of Oz.

In February 2016, the a cappella group Voctave released the video "Disney Love Medley" which featured Maldonado and her then-fiancé Jeremy Lewis. In the video, Maldonado and Lewis perform the songs "I See the Light" from Tangled, "You'll Be in My Heart" from Tarzan and "Go the Distance" from Hercules with the members of Voctave providing the backing vocals. In May 2016, Maldonado, along with Grassi and Hoying, appeared in an episode of Bones.

On May 19, 2017, Maldonado released her first solo single, "Break a Little". Her debut EP, L O V E, was released on July 14, 2017. The EP debuted at #1 on the iTunes Pop Albums Chart. In 2018, Maldonado made her Broadway debut, portraying Lauren in the musical Kinky Boots alongside singer Jake Shears and comedian Wayne Brady:

Personal life 
Maldonado met singer and entrepreneur Jeremy Lewis in August 2013 through The Sing-Off, and the two started dating in October of the same year. They got engaged on May 29, 2016 in Paris, France.  In 2017, the couple postponed their wedding to work on certain unstated "issues", eventually calling it off in October.

Maldonado is currently in a relationship with freelance filmmaker and photographer Ben Hausdorff. They have been dating since 2018, and have worked together on different projects for Pentatonix. In March 2022, Maldonado announced that she and Hausdorff were expecting their first child. Their daughter was born on June 28, 2022.

Discography
Love (2017) (as kırstın™)

Awards and nominations

References

External links

1992 births
21st-century American actresses
21st-century American singers
21st-century American women singers
American mezzo-sopranos
American people of Italian descent
American people of Mexican descent
American people of Spanish descent
American women songwriters
Grammy Award winners
Living people
Martin High School (Arlington, Texas) alumni
Pentatonix members
People from Fort Worth, Texas
People from Arlington, Texas
Singers from Texas
University of Oklahoma alumni